Tom Poole is the Chief Creative Officer and Senior Colorist at Company 3. He was born in London, England, where he began his career, before moving to the States in 2004. He joined Company 3 in 2007.

Career 
In 2013, 2015 and 2016 he won a Hollywood Post Alliance (HPA) award for Outstanding Color Grading.

Poole was recognized with two 2019 AICP awards for ‘Best Commercial Color Grading Over :90’ on National Lottery ‘Amazing Starts Here’ and ‘Best Music Video Color Grading’ for The Carters ‘Apes**t’.  In 2017 Poole won the AICP ‘Best Commercial Color Grading Over :90’ award for Squarespace ‘John's Journey’ and in 2016 the ‘Best Color Grading’ award for the Adidas ‘Future’ campaign.

In 2017 Poole was accepted into The Academy Of Motion Picture Arts & Sciences.

Selected filmography

Feature films

Television

Music videos

Commercials & Ads

References

External links

Year of birth missing (living people)
Living people
British artists